The Cambrian Law Review is a Welsh academic law journal containing articles on British and international law, book reviews, and obituaries.  It is published by the Committee of the Cambrian Law Review, on behalf of the Department of Law and Criminology, Aberystwyth University.

The journal is being digitised by the Welsh Journals Online project at the National Library of Wales.

External links
Cambrian Law Review

British law journals
Publications with year of establishment missing
Publications established in 1971
Mass media in Wales
Aberystwyth University